Kukkhato Khuni is a Bangladeshi Bengali language film released in 2000. The film is directed and produced by Montazur Rahman Akbar. The film is based on the biography of Ershad Sikder. Although the director did not admit it. The story of the film is written by Abdullah Zahir Babu. The film topped the list of highest grossing films of 2000.

Plot 
The infamous Godfather simply cut off the hands of a young man's father, and in retaliation, the young man gradually becomes a notorious murderer.

Cast 
Manna - Babul
Mousumi- Navana, Salauddin's niece
Dipzol - Tarafdar
Helal Khan - Badal
Maury - hope
Razzak - Aminul Haque, Babul's father
Dolly Zahur - Minu, Babul's mother
Dildar - Twina
Humayun Faridi - Ismail Sardar, political leader
Mizu Ahmed - Salauddin
Sadeq Siddiqui - Alam
ATM Samsuzzaman - Dal Pintu
Misha Saudagar - Misha
Jambu - Sambhu
Faqira - Maktu, brother of Tarafdar
Gangua - OC Rahman, OC of Agargaon Police Station
Azharul Islam Khan - Commissioner of Police

Music 
The music of the film is composed by Shawkat Ali Emon with lyrics by Kabir Bakul. The song "Ami Andho" has been composed by Birbal and written by Riton Adhikari Rintu.

"Mon Preme Poris Na" - Rizia Parveen
"Ami Andho" - Swapan Khan
"Shoni Robi Duidin Gelo" - Andrew Kishore, Uma Khan
"Ei Hridoyer Sada Kagoje" (part 1) - Kanak Chapa, Kumar Bishwajit
"Ei Hridoyer Sada Kagoje" (part 2) - Kanak Chapa, Kumar Bishwajit

References

External links 

Bangladeshi action films
Films directed by Montazur Rahman Akbar
Bengali-language Bangladeshi films
2000 films